Picocassette is an audio storage medium introduced by Dictaphone in collaboration with JVC in 1985. 

The Picocassette was introduced to compete with the Microcassette, introduced by Olympus, and the Mini-Cassette, by Philips.

Size

It is approximately half the size of the previous Microcassette, and was intended for highly portable dictation devices. With a tape speed of 9 millimeters per second, each cassette could hold up to 60 minutes of dictation, 30 minutes per side. The signal-to-noise ratio was 35 dB. The widest dimension of the picocassette was near 4.2 cm.

See also 

 Microcassette

 Mini-Cassette
 NT (cassette)

References

External links
 Image of a Picocassette (including ruler and Compact Cassette for comparison), at the Cassette Recorder Museum
 Techmoan: The Picocassette - Smallest Analogue Cassette Tape ever made

Audio storage
Audiovisual introductions in 1985
Tape recording
Products introduced in 1985